Eigil Nansen (18 June 1931 – 27 February 2017) was the son of architect and humanist Odd Nansen and the grandson of explorer and humanist Fridtjof Nansen.

In 1991, he won The Lisl and Leo Eitinger Prize for his work with refugees and human rights. Nansen is also known for lighting the first Winter Olympic cauldron, in 1952.

References

 
 

1931 births
Olympic cauldron lighters
2017 deaths